The Trillium class is a series of freighters owned by Canada Steamship Lines (CSL). The class is divided into three subclasses; the self-discharging lake freighters, the lake bulk carriers, and the Panamax self-discharging bulk carriers. Initially a nine-ship building program, six are operated by Canada Steamship Lines for use on the Great Lakes, while three are operated by CSL Americas for international trade. Two more ships were acquired later for use by CSL Americas.

Background
In the early 2000s, Canada Steamship Lines enquired at several shipyards concerning the availability of shipyard space for the construction of several self-discharging vessels. They were turned down by yards in China, Japan, Korea and Europe due to high demand for conventional designs. In 2008, due to the strong Canadian dollar and yard availability in China, Canada Steamship Lines began the design of the class for the eventual order to be placed in 2010. These orders were placed after the Canadian government had repealed taxes on ship construction outside of Canada.

The construction of the Trillium class, along with Algoma Central's , is the largest addition of new vessels to fleets that work the Saint Lawrence Seaway since its opening in 1959.

Trillium Laker

Lake freighter
Four Trillium-class self-discharging lake freighters and two bulk carriers were ordered in 2010 as part of a nine-ship program. The lake freighters were constructed by Chengxi shipyard in Jiangyin, China. They were designed for environmental and operational efficiency.

The Trillium self-discharging lakers have a gross tonnage (GT) of 24,430 tons. According to the Miramar Ship Index the vessels have a deadweight tonnage (DWT) of 37,690 tons. However, on the CSL website, the vessels are stated as having a GT of 24,430 and DWT of 34,500 tons. According to the Miramar Ship Index Baie Comeau has a gross tonnage (GT) of 32,000 tons.

The vessels are powered by one IMO Tier II MAN B&W 6S50ME diesel engine driving one shaft creating . They have fixed pitch thrusters in the bow and stern.

CSL asserts that the new vessels will be more efficient than existing vessels, and will leave less pollution.

Baie St. Paul was the first of the four lakers to be delivered in 2012. The ship was given an industry award shortly after delivery. For her ocean transit to North America, Baie St. Paul was fitted with temporary structures within the ship that were removed upon arrival at Montreal, Quebec. Whitefish Bay was the second ship in the class to be delivered. Thunder Bay was delivered to CSL on 16 May 2013. She was the third of the class to join the Great Lakes fleet. Baie Comeau was the final ship in the class to be delivered.

Bulk carrier
Two Trillium-class bulk carriers were ordered as part of a nine-ship building program started 2010, both were completed for CSL in 2014. Classified as LR 100A1 Great Lakes Bulk Carrier, the ships have a gross tonnage of 22,579 tons. CSL St-Laurent has a deadweight tonnage of 36,363 tons and CSL Welland has a deadweight tonnage of 36,417 tons. Both ships have five holds.

CSL Welland and CSL St-Laurent were constructed by Yangfan Shipyard in Zhoushan, China. CSL Welland was named for the Welland Canal. The ship departed China on 5 November 2014 for Montreal. CSL St-Laurent transports minerals from Côte-Nord, Quebec and grains from Western Canada.

Trillium Panamax

Three Panamax self-discharging bulk carriers were ordered as part of the 2010 nine-ship building program by Canada Steamship Lines. The three vessels were constructed at Chengxi Shipyard in Jiangyin, China along with two others of the same design constructed for Torvald Klaveness of Norway under CSL supervision.

The vessels have a GT of 43,691 tons and a DWT of 71,319 tons.

Rt. Hon. Paul E. Martin sailed on her maiden voyage on 5 October 2012 from China to Port Sechelt, British Columbia.

Ships in class

References

External links
Fleet of Canada Steamship Lines

Canada Steamship Lines
Ship classes
+